Warkop (an abbreviation of Warung Kopi, meaning "coffee stall") were an Indonesian comedy troupe that enjoyed success in radio, films and television over the 1980s and 1990s. Assembled in Jakarta on 1976 under Prambors Rasisonia management, they initially went by the name Warkop Prambors. They soon burgeoned as the country's top comedy group, surpassing Srimulat and Jakarta Group. After their film debut, they settled on the name Warkop DKI (taken from the initials of the three main members: Dono, Kasino and Indro; and also a play on Jakarta's official name, DKI Jakarta). Besides acting on numerous films, they also made sitcoms on ANteve in 1995-1997 as Warkop (Warung Kopi) DKI and Indosiar during 1997-2001 as Warkop Millennium. They also famous for some of parody songs they composed.

Early career
In the mid-1970s, Warkop joined Prambors for the Obrolan Santai di Warung Kopi weekly radio comedy program. The program featured Dono as Slamet; Kasino as Mas Bei, Acong and Buyung; Indro as Mastowi and Ubai; Nanu as Tulo; and Rudy as Mr. James and Bang Cholil. An appearance in Terminal Musikal, directed by Mus Mualim, boosted Warkop's reputation as a comedy group.

Personnel
The members are Wahjoe Sardono (Dono), Kasino Hadiwibowo (Kasino), Indrodjojo Kusumonegoro (Indro), Nanu Moeljono, and Rudy Badil. They are Javanese and university graduates. Dono, Kasino and Nanu were students at University of Indonesia and Indro was a student at Pancasila University. Their student background prompted them to incorporate social criticism into their comedy. The only surviving member of the core trio is Indro, after Kasino died from a brain tumor in 1997 and Dono died from lung cancer in 2001.

Filmography 
Warkop produced most of their work over 1979–1994, starring in 34 comedy films and 1 docudrama film. In 2021, some of the titles were available on Netflix.

References

See also
 Indonesian comedy
 Cinema of Indonesia

Indonesian comedy troupes
Theatre companies in Indonesia
Film organizations in Indonesia